Jonie Gabriel (born 30 November 1997) is a Haitian footballer who plays as a goalkeeper for Canadian club CS Fabrose and the Haiti women's national team.

International career
Gabriel made a senior appearance for Haiti on 3 October 2019.

References 

1997 births
Living people
Women's association football goalkeepers
Haitian women's footballers
Sportspeople from Port-au-Prince
Haiti women's international footballers
Haitian expatriate footballers
Haitian expatriate sportspeople in Canada
Expatriate women's soccer players in Canada